First Day is an Australian drama television series which premiered on ABC Me on 30 March 2020. The series originated as a short film of the same title which aired in 2017. The series retells elements of the short film. The series was filmed in Adelaide, South Australia including on location at Marryatville High School.

The series is written and directed by Julie Kalceff and stars Evie Macdonald as twelve year old transgender girl Hannah Bradford, as she adjusts to high school at the start of a new year. She must navigate the social and personal issues of her early teenage years, while also dealing with the pressures of her gender identity, which is largely private at the beginning of the series. Overriding themes include the focus on identity and belonging, and the exploration of transgender rights. The series was produced by Epic Films and Kojo Entertainment, in association with the South Australian Film Corporation and the Australian Children's Television Foundation (ACTF). It received principal development and production funding from the Australian Government and Screen Australia. Jan Stradling from the ABC and Bernadette O'Mahony from ACTF served as the executive producers of the series. The second and final series premiered in March 2022.

First Day and the associated short film have received a positive reception for its representation of diversity in transgender children. The short film won an award for diversity from MIPCOM and won a Prix Jeunesse Gender Equity Prize in 2018. The full series won a string of awards across 2020 and 2021, including a GLAAD Media Award and an International Emmy Kids Award. The series gained attention in the United States following its release on Hulu.

Premise
Hannah Bradford is a twelve year old transgender girl beginning her journey towards the end of primary school, and the beginning of high school. She must learn how to navigate her new environment, while also dealing with the social pressures of finding where she belongs while transitioning. As she begins high school, she presents herself as female in public for the first time. Hannah befriends Olivia, Jasmine and Natalie, who she doesn't immediately disclose her gender identity to. However, she struggles with being bullied by Isabella, a classmate from her primary school, who threatens to reveal her secret, and taunts her with her previous name. Hannah lives with her mother, Amanda; and her father, Steve, who try to protect her from the harm of external situations, which sometimes leads to disagreement and conflict.

In the second series, Hannah returns to school for a new year and is inspired to run for class captain. She competes against Jasmine, who she ended her friendship with during the previous year. She is forced to deal with microaggressions and hate speech as she learns that people still label her as the "transgender kid". Hannah starts to feel lost and ostracised from her friends and peers; in searching for a place to fit in and belong, she begins a social club for LGBTQIA+ students. She also becomes concerned for her friend Josh, who is apprehensive about returning to school after he reveals his gender identity. Hannah also considers dating when she bonds with classmate Billy.

Cast and characters

Featuring
 Evie Macdonald as Hannah Bradford, a confident twelve year old transgender girl, who has interests in taekwondo

Other cast
 Joanne Hunt as Amanda Bradford, Hannah's mother
 Brenna Harding as Ms. Fraser, Hannah's high school Mathematics and home room teacher 
 Anthony Brandon Wong as Mr. Nguyen (series 1), the principal of Hillview High School
 Pete Ferris as Mr. Reynolds (series 2), the new principal of Hillview High School
 Mark Saturno as Steve Bradford, Hannah's father
 Ethan Gifford as Jack Bradford, Hannah's older brother
 Elena Liu as Olivia, a friend of Hannah's who she bonds with on her first day of high school
 Nandini Rajagopal as Natalie, a new friend of Hannah's
 Arwen Diamond as Jasmine, a new friend of Hannah's, who later decides to end their friendship
 Isabel Burmester as Isabella, a former primary school student who recognises Hannah
 Jake Childs as Sarah (later Josh), a classmate of Hannah's struggling with their own gender identity who later comes out as a transgender boy
 Maddy Miotti as Savannah, a friend of Isabella's who supports and joins in on bullying Hannah
 Jackson Evans as Billy (series 2), a classmate of Hannah's who she starts to develop feelings for
 Maiah Stewardson as Sam (series 2), an older student who assists Hannah by attending her Pride club
 Thai Hoa (Steven) Nguyen as Lachlan (series 2), an older student, friends with Sam, who also attends the Pride club
 Joe Bird as Kevin (series 2), a classmate of Hannah's who Hannah speaks to about class captain
 Olivia Jensen as Amber (series 2), the new girlfriend of Billy, which makes Hannah jealous
 Zoe O'Callaghan as Avery (series 2), a classmate of Hannah's who Hannah speaks to about class captain
 Isabeau Bottroff as Kylie (series 2), a classmate of Hannah's who is reluctant about the new uniform petition

Production
First Day was first commissioned in 2017 as a stand-alone episode. The one-off drama was created through Screen Australia and ABC Children's Girls Initiative, which was created as a funding program to strengthen Australian female producers. The short film screened as part of International Day of the Girl. Evie Macdonald starred in the special as Hannah Bradford, and became the first transgender actor to star in the lead role of an Australian scripted television drama. Macdonald was twelve years old at the time of filming and had not previously acted. Julie Kalceff wrote and directed the project. Kalceff was motivated to increase visibility of the LGBTQIA+ community through telling a story about a transgender teenager, after being inspired by a family member who was transitioning. She believed it was important to have a transgender girl play Hannah, which resulted in MacDonald's casting, and stated that if they couldn't find the right actor, the film wouldn't have been made.

In June 2019, a miniseries based on the original short film was ordered by the Australian Broadcasting Corporation to air on ABC Me. Kalceff and Stark had pitched a series to the ABC, and it took eighteen months to be ordered. The series was financed through the South Australian Film Corporation and the Australian Children's Television Foundation (ACTF). Also titled First Day, Macdonald and the original creative team were named to return to the production, which would be told as a four-part series. Kalceff, the series creator, was attached to the project as the writer and director, along with producers Kirsty Stark, Kate Croser, and co-producer Kate Butler. The series was filmed in Adelaide and led by Kalceff, who served as the writer and director for all episodes. Kalceff wanted to empower Macdonald to tell her story as a transgender girl. Filming began in July 2019 in South Australia, with a local crew. Kalceff stated she was excited to tell the original story in more detail. The series was produced by Epic Films in association with Kojo Entertainment, and international sales of the series were handled by ACTF. The full series premiered on 30 March 2020 on ABC Me.

In November 2020, the ACTF invested funding in a second series of First Day, to consist of an additional four episodes. The second series was officially ordered in May 2021, with the new episodes to depict Hannah's second year at high school. Production again took place in Adelaide, and filming concluded on 4 August 2021. International broadcaster Hulu joined the production as a co-investing partner. The second series will premiere on ABC Me on 31 March 2022. Kalceff wanted to continue Hannah's story and show the character dealing with regular teenage issues, while also addressing microaggressions towards transgender identity. Upon the release of the second series in March 2022, Kalceff said that no further episodes would be made, due to the ages of the cast.

Episodes

Short film (2017)

Series 1 (2020)

Series 2 (2022)

Release
In September 2020, the series began streaming on Hulu in the United States and began airing on CBBC in the United Kingdom. In March 2021, the series launched on CBC Gem in Canada.

Awards and nominations

Reception
The short film won a diversity award from MIPCOM, who stated that the prize was awarded for "promoting understanding and acceptance" of transgender children who are transitioning, which was depicted through the character of Hannah beginning high school.

Reviewing the full series in 2020, David Knox of TV Tonight described it as "the most inclusive, most authentic kid's drama since Dance Academy". He praised Kalceff for her delicate handling of conflict in the series, as well as MacDonald for the nuance in her performance. Knox stated that he would have liked to see the series explore issues in further detail.

Notes

References

External links
 

Australian Broadcasting Corporation original programming
2020s Australian television series
2020 Australian television series debuts
Australian children's television series
English-language television shows
Television shows set in Australia
Transgender-related television shows
2020s LGBT-related drama television series
Australian LGBT-related television shows
Films about trans women
2017 LGBT-related films